is a one runway airport serving the island of Minami Torishima, Japan. The aerodrome used to be a military airstrip and according to the Japanese Aeronautical Information Service, is still operated by the Japan Maritime Self-Defense Force.

The airstrip existence dates to 1935 when the Imperial Japanese Navy built one to serve a meteorological station. The original airfield consisted of two airstrips (cleared area of 4000' and 4500', but only shorter sections used as landing area) in a v-shaped formation.

The airstrips facilities were damaged by US bombing of the island during World War II, and was re-built with a single runway by the United States Naval Mobile Construction Battalion 9 in 1964. Until 1993, the airstrip was used and controlled by the United States Coast Guard to service the nearby LORAN-C station. In 2009 the airstrip was transferred to the Japan Maritime Self-Defense Force which currently retains control of the airstrip and is used by the Japan Meteorological Agency to service and staff their operations on the island.

References

Airports in Tokyo
Japan Maritime Self-Defense Force bases
Transport in the Greater Tokyo Area